Diospyros areolata is a tree in the family Ebenaceae. Twigs are reddish brown when young. Inflorescences usually bear three flowers. The specific epithet  is from the Latin meaning "net-like", referring to the leaf veins. Habitat is lowland mixed dipterocarp and swamp forests. D. areolata is found in Peninsular Thailand, Sumatra, Peninsular Malaysia, Java and Borneo.

References

areolata
Plants described in 1906
Trees of Thailand
Trees of Malesia